During the 1996–97 English football season, Sheffield United competed in the Football League First Division.

Season summary
In the 1996–97 season, Howard Kendall's first full season in charge, the Blades finished fifth in Division One to qualify for the play-offs. In the play-off final at Wembley, the Blades lost to a last minute goal from David Hopkin and Crystal Palace earned the final promotion spot to the Premier League. In June 1997, Kendall left the club by mutual consent to return to Everton for a third spell as manager.

Players

First-team squad

Final league table

Matches
Source:

Key

Division One

Playoffs

FA Cup

League Cup

Steel City Cup

Friendlies

References

Notes

Sheffield United F.C. seasons
Sheffield United